Arcobara is a genus of moths in the family Geometridae erected by Francis Walker in 1863.

Species
Arcobara flexistrigata (Warren, 1900)
Arcobara multilineata (Hulst, 1887)
Arcobara perlineata (Schaus, 1913)
Arcobara tergeminaria (Herrich-Schäffer, [1855])

References

Sterrhini
Geometridae genera